Cham Qabrestan may refer to:

Cham Qabrestan, Pol-e Dokhtar, Iranian village
Cham Qabrestan, Selseleh, Iranian village